Casagrande v München (1974) Case 9/74 is an EU law case, concerning discrimination in the education system.

In 1974, the European Court of Justice ruled that the prohibitions against discrimination covered by the European Communities' treaties extended to persons in the education system.
The Casagrande case (9/74) held that under Regulation 1612/68 (on the Freedom of movement for workers), Art. 12 must be interpreted as giving the children of migrant workers access to education (and provisions therefore) on the same basis as host country nationals. The court's interpretation included not only access, but also 'general measures intended to facilitate educational attendance' (para. 9).

Notes

External references
EURLex. Donato Casagrande v Landeshauptstadt München, 1974 European Court Reports (European Court of Justice 1974).
EUabc.com: Casagrande case. Accessed August 23, 2013.
Gori, Gisella. "Towards an EU Right to Education". The Hague: Kluwer Law International, 2001.

Court of Justice of the European Union case law
Education in the European Union
Education policy
Education